The 5th constituency of Budapest is one of the single member constituencies of the National Assembly, the national legislature of Hungary. The constituency standard abbreviation: Budapest 05. OEVK.

Since 2014, it has been represented by Lajos Oláh of the DK.

Geography
The 5th constituency is located in central-western part of Pest.

The constituency borders with 7th constituency to the north, 8th constituency to the east, 6th constituency to the south and 1st constituency to the west.

List of districts
The constituency includes the following municipalities:

 District VI.: Full part of the district.
 District VII.: Full part of the district.

History
The 5th constituency of Budapest was created in 2011 and contained of the pre-2011 abolished constituencies of the 8th and 9th constituency of the capital. Its borders have not changed since its creation.

Members
The constituency was first represented by Lajos Oláh of Independet (with Unity support) from 2014, and he was re-elected of the DK in 2018 and 2022 (with United for Hungary support).

Election result

2022 election

2018 election

2014 election

Notes

References

Budapest 5th